Brian Reginald Tobin  (born 5 December 1930) is the former president of the International Tennis Federation from 1991 to 1999. He was awarded the Order of Australia in 1986 and the Olympic Order in 1999. Apart from awards, he was inducted into the International Tennis Hall of Fame in 2003 and the Australian Tennis Hall of Fame in 2004.

Early life and education
Tobin was born on 5 December 1930 in Perth, Western Australia. As a teenager, Tobin played Australian rules football before switching to tennis. He attended Christian Brothers' College, Perth for his post-secondary education.

Career
As a tennis player, Tobin appeared at his first Grand Slam tournament during the 1949 Australian Championships. During the 1950s and 1960s, he played in multiple Australian Championships in singles and doubles events. Outside of Australia, Tobin participated at the 1964 French Championships where he reached the first round in doubles.

Apart from playing tennis, Tobin was the captain of the Australian team that won the 1964 Federation Cup. He began his executive career as a member of Tennis Australia in 1965. He was promoted to president in 1977 and remained with the organization until 1989. He later became president of the International Tennis Federation from 1991 to 1999.

Awards and honours
Tobin was appointed a Member of the Order of Australia (AM) in the 1986 Australia Day Honours, "for service to tennis, particularly in the field of administration"; he was additionally awarded the Olympic Order in 1999. Tobin was first inducted into the Sport Australia Hall of Fame in 1991. Subsequent hall of fame inductions for Tobin were the International Tennis Hall of Fame in 2003 and the Australian Tennis Hall of Fame in 2004.

References

External links
 
 
 

1930 births
Australian male tennis players
Members of the Order of Australia
Recipients of the Olympic Order
Sport Australia Hall of Fame inductees
International Tennis Hall of Fame inductees
Tennis executives
Living people
Presidents of the International Tennis Federation
Tennis players from Perth, Western Australia